The Hualien Al-Falah Mosque is a mosque in Hualien City, Hualien County, Taiwan. It is the ninth and latest mosque built in Taiwan. It is also the first mosque in Hualien County.

History
The mosque was inaugurated by former Indonesian Minister of Law and Human Rights Mahfud MD on 18 March 2018. On 10 November 2019, an information and complaint service counter for Indonesian migrant workers in Taiwan was established at the meeting room of the mosque building.

Activities
The mosque is the venue for Quran recitation activities by Majelis Taklim Nurul Iman Hualien. The mosque is also the center for information and complaint center for the migrant workers from Indonesia.

Transportation
The mosque is accessible within walking distance northwest of Hualien Station of Taiwan Railways.

See also
 Islam in Taiwan
 List of mosques in Taiwan

References

External links

 

2018 establishments in Taiwan
Buildings and structures in Hualien County
Mosques completed in 2018
Mosques in Taiwan
Hualien City